Shafiqullah Ghafari (born 8 October 2001) is an Afghan cricketer. He made his first-class debut for Kabul Region in the 2019 Ahmad Shah Abdali 4-day Tournament on 4 April 2019. He made his Twenty20 debut on 8 October 2019, for Mis Ainak Knights in the 2019 Shpageeza Cricket League.

In December 2019, he was named in Afghanistan's squad for the 2020 Under-19 Cricket World Cup. In the opening fixture of the tournament, he took six wickets for fifteen runs. These were the best figures for a Afghanistan bowler in a U19 World Cup match. He was the leading wicket-taker for Afghanistan in the tournament, with sixteen dismissals in five matches. He made his List A debut on 16 October 2020, for Band-e-Amir Region in the 2020 Ghazi Amanullah Khan Regional One Day Tournament.

References

External links
 

2001 births
Living people
Afghan cricketers
Kabul Eagles cricketers
Band-e-Amir Dragons cricketers
Place of birth missing (living people)